Glaphyria decisa is a moth in the family Crambidae. It was described by Francis Walker in 1866. It is found from Guatemala to south-eastern Paraguay. It is also found in Cuba.

References

Moths described in 1866
Glaphyriini
Moths of North America
Moths of South America